Joseph Roach is an American theater historian and scholar, a Sterling Professor emeritus at Yale University, and also a published author. He was also given an honorary Doctor of Letters by University of Warwick.

References

Year of birth missing (living people)
Living people
Yale University faculty
Yale Sterling Professors
21st-century American historians
21st-century American male writers
American male non-fiction writers